John Bridge Aspinall (13 August 1877 – 21 June 1932) was an Irish barrister and first-class cricketer.

Life
The only son of English mechanical engineer John Aspinall, he was born in the Dublin suburb of Inchicore in August 1877; His grandfather was John Bridge Aspinall, the recorder for Liverpool. He was educated in England at Stonyhurst College, before going up to Christ Church, Oxford. After graduating from Oxford, he became a barrister.

Aspinall was the Remembrancer for the City of London from 1927 until his death in 1932. He died at his Lincoln's Inn home in June 1932.

Cricketer
Aspinall toured British India with the Oxford University Authentics in 1902–03, making two first-class appearances on the tour against Bombay and the Parsees. He scored 42 in his two first-class matches, with a high score of 20.

References

External links

1877 births
1932 deaths
People from Inchicore
People educated at Stonyhurst College
Alumni of Christ Church, Oxford
Members of Lincoln's Inn
Irish barristers
Irish cricketers
Oxford University Authentics cricketers